Bierzwnik may refer to the following places in West Pomeranian Voivodeship, Poland:

Bierzwnik, Choszczno County
Bierzwnik, Myślibórz County